Tropiocolotes is a genus of geckos, lizards in the family Gekkonidae. The genus is native to North Africa and the Middle East. They are commonly known as dwarf geckos, pygmy geckos, or sand geckos. They have an elongated body and the head is oval and of equal or lesser width than the body.

Species & subspecies
The following species and subspecies are recognized as being valid.

Tropiocolotes algericus  – Algerian sand gecko
Tropiocolotes bisharicus  – Bishari dwarf gecko
Tropiocolotes chirioi  
Tropiocolotes confusus 
Tropiocolotes hormozganensis 
Tropiocolotes nattereri  – Natterer's gecko
Tropiocolotes naybandensis 
Tropiocolotes nubicus  – Steudner's gecko
Tropiocolotes scorteccii  – Scortecci's sand gecko
Tropiocolotes somalicus  – Parker's pigmy gecko
Tropiocolotes steudneri  – Steudner's dwarf gecko
Tropiocolotes tassiliensis 
Tropiocolotes tripolitanus  – northern sand gecko, Tripoli gecko
Tropiocolotes tripolitanus apoklomax 
Tropiocolotes tripolitanus occidentalis 
Tropiocolotes tripolitanus tripolitanus 
Tropiocolotes wolfgangboehmei 
Tropiocolotes yomtovi 

Nota bene: A binomial authority in parentheses indicates that the species was originally described in a genus other than Tropiocolotes.

References

Further reading
Baha El Din SM (2001). "A synopsis of African and south Arabian geckos of the genus Tropiocolotes (Reptilia: Gekkonidae), with a description of a new species from Egypt". Zoology in the Middle East 22: 45-56.
Peters W (1880). "Über die von Hrn. Gerhard Rohlfs und Dr. A. Stecker auf der Reise nach der Oase Kufra gesammelten Amphibien ". Monatsberichte der Königlich Preussischen Akademie der Wissenschaften zu Berlin 1880: 305-309. (Tropiocolotes, new genus, p. 306). (in German and Latin).

 
Geckos
Lizard genera
Taxa named by Wilhelm Peters